
Year 263 BC was a year of the pre-Julian Roman calendar. At the time it was known as the Year of the Consulship of Mesella and Crassus (or, less frequently, year 491 Ab urbe condita). The denomination 263 BC for this year has been used since the early medieval period, when the Anno Domini calendar era became the prevalent method in Europe for naming years.

Events 
 By place 

 Roman Republic 
 The Romans under the consul Manius Valerius Messalla secure the alliance of Hiero II of Syracuse. The treaty with Rome restricts Hiero's kingdom to southeast Sicily and the eastern coast of Sicily as far as Tauromenium. From this date until his death, Hiero remains loyal to the Romans.
 The Romans capture Hadranum.

 Greece 
 Alexander II of Epirus attacks and conquers the greater part of Macedonia. However, he is then driven out of both Macedonia and Epirus by Demetrius II, the son of King Antigonus II Gonatas of Macedonia.
 The Athenians and Spartans, worn down by several years of war and the devastation of their lands, make peace with Antigonus II of Macedonia who thus retains his hold on southern Greece.
 Cleanthes succeeds Zeno of Citium in his Stoic School in Athens.

 Asia Minor 
 Eumenes I succeeds his uncle Philetaerus to the throne of Pergamum. As Philetaerus was a eunuch, he adopted his nephew Eumenes (the son of Philetaerus' brother also named Eumenes) as his successor.

 China 
 General Bai Qi of the State of Qin captures the Han province of Nan, thereby cutting off Shangdang Commandery from the rest of the Han state. This commandery subsequently surrenders itself to the State of Zhao rather than transfer to Qin control, which will set up the climactic Battle of Changping in 260 BC.

Births 
 Antigonus III Doson, king of Macedonia from 229 to 221 BC (d. 221 BC)

Deaths 
 Philetaerus, founder (reigned from 282 BC) of the Attalid dynasty, a line of rulers of a powerful kingdom of Pergamum, in northwest Asia Minor (b. c. 343 BC)
 Qingxiang of Chu, Chinese king of Chu (Warring States Period)

References